The Malaysia national futsal team represents Malaysia in international futsal competitions and is controlled by the Football Association of Malaysia. Malaysia once played in the FIFA Futsal World Cup in 1996.

Tournament records

FIFA Futsal World Cup

AFC Futsal Asian Cup

*Denotes draws include knockout matches decided on penalty kicks.
*Red border colour indicates tournament was held on home soil.

OFC Futsal Championship 

^Malaysia is not part of the OFC, invited as a guest nation.
*Denotes draws include knockout matches decided on penalty kicks.

AFF Futsal Championship

Asian Indoor and Martial Arts Games

Southeast Asian Games

Tiger's Cup/World 5's Futsal 

*Red border colour indicates tournament was held on home soil.

Current staff 
 Team Manager – Rosmadi Ismail
 Security Officer - Dali Wahid
 Head coach – Chiew Chun Yong
 Assistant coach - Jasman Patmee Meera
 Assistant coach - Jamhuree Zainuddin
 Physiotherapist - Harris Zafran Ahmad Haraman

Coaches

Players

Current squad 
The following players were named for  2021 Southeast Asian Games.

Previous squads 

AFC Futsal Championship
 2018 AFC Futsal Championship squads

Notes:
 INJ Withdrew due to injury
 RET Retired from the national team

Results

Honours

Continental 
 Oceanian Futsal Championship
  Champion (1) : 2014
  Runner-up (1) : 2013

Regional 
 ASEAN Futsal Championship
  Runner-up (5) : 2003, 2005, 2010, 2017, 2018
  Third place (4) : 2007, 2008, 2015, 2016
 Fourth place (1) : 2012
 SEA Games
  Silver medal (2) : 2007, 2017
 Fourth place (1) : 2011
 Pre-SEA Games Futsal Test match 2013
  Runner-up

Others 
 KL World 5's
  Bowl Winners (1) : 2003
 Taipei 2004 International Tournament
 Fourth place
 Alcudia International Futsal Tournament
  Third place (1) : 2013
 England International Futsal 4 Nations Tournament
 Fourth place (1) : 2013

 Belt & Road Cup CFA Futsal
  Winners (1) : 2018

All-time team record 

The following table shows Malaysia's all-time international record, correct as of 8 September 2019.

*Draws include knockout matches decided on penalty kicks.

Player history 
Players in bold are still active. As of 16 August 2014.

Top goalscorers

Notable former players 

 Anuar Jusoh
 Azman Adnan
 Mazran Ramli
 Azrul Amri Burhan
 Dollah Salleh
 Mudzar Mohamad
 Nazri Yunus
 Jamhuri Zainuddin
 Mior Zaki
 Faizul Gaffar
 Jerry Dinesh
 Fadzhim Khushaini
 Feroz Karnim
 Saiful Mohd Noor
 Rizal Rahim
 Zaidi Ibrahim
 Fairuz Mohd Noor
 Maizal Hairi Marzuki
 Addie Azwan
 Raizuwah Idris
 Khairul Azman Mohamed
 Lim Seng Kong
 Rosdee Sulong
 Zainal Abidin Hassan
 Zami Mohamed Nor
 Mohd Noor Derus
 Azmin Azram Abdul Aziz
 Yap Wai Loon
 Idris Abdul Karim
 Nazzab Hidzan
 Chiew Chun Yong
 Faris Ahmad
 Faidi Zakaria
 Ng Boon Leong
 Ruzaley Aziz
 S. Sathiyaseelan
 Fadhil Yusoff
 S. Devandran
 Fadzil Karnim
 Safar Mohammad
 Muizuddin Haris

See also 
 Malaysia women's national futsal team
 Malaysia National Futsal League

References

External links 
 Arena Futsal Malaysia
 Football Association of Malaysia

 
Asian national futsal teams
National